Emma Becker (born 14 December 1988 in Île-de-France as Emma Durand) is a French writer living in Berlin. Her pen name Becker is derived from Pannebecker, the family name of her German grandmother.

Biography 
Becker grew up in a middle-class family in Île-de-France (greater Paris region). Her father was an entrepreneur and her mother a psychologist. She attended a Catholic high school  (lycée Montalembert), which she completed with the Baccalauréat (high school diploma) in 2006. Afterwards she studied literature at the New Sorbonne University  (Sorbonne Nouvelle). In 2011 she published her first book, an erotic novel with the title Mr.. It describes the relationship of young female student and an older married man based her own experiences. After a failed relationship Becker left Paris to move to Berlin, where one of her aunts lived. There she worked on her second book and gave birth to a son. After the publication of her second book, she became interested in writing about prostitution and in an effort to immerse herself into that world she worked for two years as a prostitute in two local brothels. She described her experiences later in the autofiction novel La Maison, which was published in 2019.

Books 
Mr.. Éditions Denoël, 2011, 
 English edition: Monsieur. Arcade Publishing, 2012, translated by  Maxim Jakubowski
 Alice. Éditions Denoël, 2015, 
 La Maison. Éditions Flammarion, 2019, 
 L’inconduite. Éditions Albin Michel, 2022, ISBN 978-2-22-647560-2.

References

External links 

Monsieur: An Erotic Novel - Review in Publishers Weekly
Life as a prostitute: Author Emma Becker on working in a brothel to research novel. France 24, 14 October 2019 (video, 8:19 mins)
Emma Becker : "Le sexe est le dernier bastion d'apolitisme dans l'existence". France culture, 15 September 2019

1988 births
Living people
Female sex workers
Pseudonymous women writers
21st-century French novelists
21st-century French women writers
French women novelists
21st-century pseudonymous writers
French sex workers
Writers from Île-de-France